Juan Carlos Núñez Armas (born 15 May 1964) is a Mexican politician affiliated with the National Action Party. As of 2014 he served as Deputy of the LIX Legislature of the Mexican Congress representing the State of Mexico.

He also served as Municipal President of Toluca from 2000 to 2003.

References

1964 births
Living people
Politicians from Michoacán
National Action Party (Mexico) politicians
Municipal presidents in the State of Mexico
Members of the Congress of the State of Mexico
People from Zitácuaro
20th-century Mexican politicians
21st-century Mexican politicians
Deputies of the LIX Legislature of Mexico
Members of the Chamber of Deputies (Mexico) for the State of Mexico